Redbud Park is a former settlement in Napa County, California. It lay at an elevation of 443 feet (135 m).

The place is now under Lake Berryessa.

References

Former settlements in Napa County, California
Former populated places in California
Submerged settlements in the United States